Staffordshire Moorlands is a local government district in Staffordshire, England. Its council, Staffordshire Moorlands District Council, is based in Leek, between the city of Stoke-on-Trent and the Peak District National Park. The 2001 census recorded the population as 94,489.

Principal industries are agriculture, fashion and tourism. The area's three towns are Leek, Cheadle and Biddulph. Visitor attractions include the National Trust property Biddulph Grange, the Churnet Valley Railway, the UK's largest theme park Alton Towers Resort, and the annual Leek Arts Festival. There are also a variety of outdoor pursuits such as rock climbing (The Roaches), sailing (Rudyard Lake) and cycling (Waterhouses).

Governance

The district was formed on 1 April 1974, under the Local Government Act 1972, as a merger of the urban districts of Biddulph and Leek, along with Cheadle and Leek Rural Districts.

Staffordshire Moorlands is the local UK Parliament constituency. Its boundaries do not match up with the District Council area. The MP since 2010 has been Karen Bradley, a Conservative. She served as Secretary of State for Culture, Media and Sport from 14 July 2016 until 8 January 2018, when she was appointed Secretary of State for Northern Ireland.

The Leader of the Council is Paul Roberts of the Conservative Party, appointed in May 2022. The next elections are due in 2023.

Energy policy

Geography

The Staffordshire Moorlands district is in the southern end and foothills of the Pennines, with some of the northern parts lying in the Peak District National Park. The terrain is mostly uplands to the north of the district and lower-lying to the south, with rolling hills, crags and valleys across forests and lakes. The upland terrain is divided into high gritstone moorlands of the Dark Peak in the north west and limestone landscape of the White Peak in the north east. The district is named after the moors in the north west along with smaller patches of lowland heaths across the district, such as Wetley Moor near Werrington. The highest point in both the district and Staffordshire is Cheeks Hill, rising up to 520m (1,710 feet) on Axe Edge Moor.

The area approximately between Axe Edge Moor and the Churnet Valley is in the Dark Peak and includes the Roaches, a series of gritstone outcrops which rises to 505m (1,657 feet) and where several red-necked wallabies roamed free for many years. On the other hand, the western half of Dovedale and the Manifold Valley, including Thor's Cave, Wetton Mill, Longnor and Butterton, are in the White Peak. The Churnet Valley is a steep-sided, wooded valley in the south of the district, running between Cheddleton and Rocester, also known as "The Rhineland of Staffordshire" or Staffordshire's "Little Switzerland".

The Staffordshire Moorlands is also home to the highest village in Britain, Flash. This record was confirmed in 2007 by the Ordnance Survey after Wanlockhead in Scotland also claimed the record. The BBC's The One Show investigated the case in a bid to settle the argument and Flash turned out to be the higher of the two.

The council maintains a number of local nature reserves including Biddulph Valley Way, Brough Park Fields, Cecilly Brook, Hales Hall Pool, Hoften's Cross Meadows, Ladderedge Country Park and Marshes Hill Common.

History
Historically the present day Staffordshire Moorlands District was contained in the Hundred of Totmonslow, except for the parish of Biddulph, which was in Pirehill Hundred. The District makes up the majority of the area of the now obsolete Totmonslow Hundred, with the remaining area of the Hundred now falling in East Staffordshire District. The Hundred was named after a small hamlet of Totmonslow in the parish of Draycott in the Moors, which is within Staffordshire Moorlands District.

Performance
In July 2007 it was announced that Staffordshire Moorlands District Council was the best-performing council in Staffordshire and the wider West Midlands region, after achieving 'excellent' status in an independent report by the Audit Commission. This means the council is one of only 33 'excellent' district councils out of 238 nationwide.

Twinnings
Staffordshire Moorlands has twinning agreements with:
  Olkusz, Poland

References

External links
 Staffordshire Moorlands District Council
 Collection of Staffordshire Moorlands Scenes

 
Non-metropolitan districts of Staffordshire